Ephippiger perforatus, the North Apennine saddle bush-cricket, is a species of insect in the family Tettigoniidae.

Distribution
Ephippiger perforatus is endemic to Italy. This species occurs from the Northwest to the Southern Itay, but in the southern part of its range it is much rarer and seems to be declining.

Habitat

Description
The body of these bush-crickets is usually light green. The pronotum resembles a saddle. The atrophied wings are unfit to flight. The base of tegmina is brownish or blackish, with a yellowish outer margin.

Bibliography
 Burr. 1907. Entomologist's Rec. J. Var. 19:299
 Dubrony (1878) Liste des Orthoptères recueillis jusqu'ici en Ligurie, Annali del Museo Civico di Storia Naturale 'Giacomo Doria', Genova (Ann. Mus. Civ. Stor. Nat. Genova) 12:5-23
 Rossius (1790), Fauna Etrusca 1
 Targioni-Tozzetti (1882), Ortotteri agrari cioè dei diversi insetti dell'ordine degli ortotteri nocivi o vantaggiosi all'agricoltura o all'economia domestica e principalmente delle cavallette, Annali di Agricoltura, Firenze, Bencini 238 pp., 68 figs.
Massa, Fontana, Buzzetti, Kleukers & Odé. 2012. Fauna d'Italia. Orthoptera 48:295

References

External links
  Grasshoppers of Europe

perforatus
Insects described in 1790
Orthoptera of Europe